Tombstone Terror is a 1935 American Western film directed by Robert N. Bradbury and starring Bob Steele.

Cast
 Bob Steele as Jimmy Dixon / Duke Dixon
 Kay McCoy as Jean Adams
 George 'Gabby' Hayes as Soupy Baxter (as George Hayes)
 Earl Dwire as Regan
 John Elliott as Mr. Dixon
 Hortense Petra as Blondie
 Anne Howard as Nurse Mary (as Ann Howard)
 Nancy Deshon as Millie (as Nancy DeShon)
 Frank McCarroll as Swede

References

External links
 

1935 films
1930s action adventure films
1935 Western (genre) films
American action adventure films
American black-and-white films
1930s English-language films
American Western (genre) films
Films directed by Robert N. Bradbury
1930s American films